Hubert Berchtold (born 28 July 1950) is a former Austrian alpine skier who won a race in World Cup.

Career
During his career he has achieved 6 results among the top 10 (1 podium: a victory) in the World Cup.

World Cup results
Top 10

Europa Cup results
Berchtold has won a Europa Cup discipline cup.

FIS Alpine Ski Europa Cup
Giant slalom: 1972

References

External links
 
 
 Hubert Berchtold at Skisports365
 Hubert Berchtold at SC Alberschwende 

1950 births
Living people
Austrian male alpine skiers